Beech Bottom Dyke, is a large ditch running for almost a mile at the northern edge of St Albans, Hertfordshire flanked by banks on both sides. Beyond the railway embankment it continues, to finish just short of the St Albans to Sandridge road. This part is not accessible to the public.

It was constructed towards the end of the Iron Age, probably between 5 and 40 AD. This, and other similar earthworks in the district, may have been built by the powerful Celtic tribe established in this area, the Catuvellauni, probably by King Cunobelinus to define areas of land around their tribal centre at Verlamion - the predecessor of the Roman city of Verulamium.

Beech Bottom Dyke is thought to have originally been part of a defensive system for a Belgaic settlement. Other defences are the Devil's Dyke and another ancient earthwork known as "The Slad". These may have created a defensive earthwork running from the River Lea to the River Ver enclosing a very large area.

References

History of Hertfordshire
History of St Albans
Iron Age sites in England
Archaeological sites in Hertfordshire
Ancient dikes
Buildings and structures in St Albans
Linear earthworks